Corzuela is a town in Chaco Province, Argentina. It is the head town of the General Belgrano Department. It was founded on April 30, 1917.

External links

Populated places in Chaco Province
Populated places established in 1917